"Hypnotized" is the fourth single from the English alternative rock band Spacemen 3 and the band's first single to enter the UK charts. It charted at position #85. It was released in July 1989 as a 7", 12" and CD single. The first 5000 12" copies came with a free poster.

Track listing
7" (BLAZE 36S)

12" (BLAZE 36T) and CDS (BLAZE 36CD)

Personnel

Spacemen 3
Sonic Boom – vocals, guitar, keyboards, producer
Jason – guitar, vocals, organ, producer
Willie - bass
Jon – drums

Additional personnel
Alex Green - saxophone
Owen John- violin
Paul Adkins - engineer

References

1989 singles
1989 songs
UK Independent Singles Chart number-one singles